A  is an event or meeting of a Literary society. Also known as simply 

It can also be used to refer to a mutual aid group or meeting.

Thus, the term "ko" covers a wide range of subjects.

Original meaning and its evolution 

During the Heian period, Tiantai rose among the aristocrats, and they financed the eight Buddhist rites of the Lotus Sutra, which were lavishly decorated. This led to the development of "kōko," or religious meetings away from the study of Buddhist scriptures, among the secular classes (e.g., Hōonkō).。In the process of the spread of "ko" to the private sector from around Middle Ages, the name "ko" came to be applied to various religious groups. There are two types of "ko" as a religious group: those that arose spontaneously from within the local community and those that were introduced from outside.

The former type of ko is operated by udeshi, or shrine parishioners, who believe in a local deity such as Ujigami or a local land of origin, for the maintenance of their shrine. Some of the "ko" of shrines of high rank have members in a wide area beyond the scope of the "village". The organization of "ko" was strengthened in the Sengoku era. The Jōdo Shinshu "kōko" organization was responsible for the Kaga Ikkyō Putsch and other revolts. The Jōdo Shinshū organization was responsible for the Kaga Ikkyō Revolt and other revolts. A "ko" is also called a "kosha," and its members are called "kojin. In the management of a "ko," officers such as a "kougen," "sub-kougen," and "seiinin" are appointed from among the members of the "ko," who are usually commissioned by the temples and shrines where the "ko" is believed in. On the other hand, in some cases, such as Yama-no-Kami and Chinjugami, the members of the local religious group are directly affiliated with the family or local community, and the group is not a purely religious organization.。

Initially, the Kosha introduced from outside were related to mountain beliefs. Tateyama and other mountain ascetics traveled around the country encouraging people to climb sacred mountains, and "worshipping groups" were established in various regions. Following their example, many Kosha were established for worshipping at shrines and temples in various regions. Some of these "worshipping groups" had a "general visit" where all members of the group went to visit shrines and temples, but most of them had a "vicarious visit" where several members were selected from among the group and represented the group. The conversion to mutual aid groups (Rai Moshiko Kou and Mujin Kou) was derived from these "daisan-ko". In other words, instead of everyone paying together to go to the shrine, the money is shared among the members through lotteries and bidding. In addition, there existed a wide variety of "workmates' groups" (moyai-ko, yui-ko, etc.) and "age- and gender-based groups" (wakashu-ko, kaka-ko, etc.) that existed alongside the faith-based groups.。While these were obligatory for community members to join, there were also free-participation "yuyama Kosha" for the purpose of fun and other activities.

References

Bibliography 

 関口博巨、福田アジオ（編）、2006、「講と日待」、『結衆・結社の日本史』、山川出版社〈結社の世界史〉

See also 

  (Related to Buddhism)
 
 Buddhist chant
 
 
 Folk religion
 
 
 
 Religious organization
 Christian Church
 Sect
 Cult
 Awa Dance Festival
 Religious community
Buddhist organizations
Buddhist holidays
Shinto
Pages with unreviewed translations